Giardina is an Italian surname, derived from Giardino (Garden), may refer to:
Salvatore Giardina, Textiles adjunct professor, VP Sales & Design
Anthony Giardina, American writer
Camillo Giardina (1907–1985), Italian Christian Democrat politician
Denise Giardina, American novelist
Giovanna Giardina, Italian film and television actress, also known as Gaia Germani
Salvatore Giardina, Italian footballer
Tiffany Giardina (currently known as Stalking Gia), American pop singer
Timothy Michael "Tim" Giardina (born 1957), U.S. Navy officer and formerly the deputy commander of U.S. nuclear forces
Umberto Giardina, Italian former international table tennis player

Other
Giardina Gallotti, a village in the Sicilian province of Agrigento, Italy

See also
 Giardina surname in Sicily 
Giardino (disambiguation)

Italian-language surnames